was a town located in Minamiuonuma District, Niigata Prefecture, Japan.

As of 2003, the town had an estimated population of 28,687 and a density of 108.75 persons per km². The total area was 263.79 km².

Muikamachi was a popular destination for skiers.

On November 1, 2004, Muikamachi, along with the town of Yamato (also from Minamiuonuma District), was merged to create the city of Minamiuonuma.

Dissolved municipalities of Niigata Prefecture
Minamiuonuma